The 1962 Intercontinental Cup was a football tie held over two legs between Brazilian club Santos, winners of the 1962 Copa Libertadores, and Portuguese club Benfica, winners of the 1961–62 European Cup. Santos won the Intercontinental Cup for the first time.

The tie is remembered as pitching Brazilian player Pelé against Portuguese player Eusébio, two of the leading players of the 1960s, who played against each other on only three occasions. It is considered that the second leg, Santos' 2–5 win in Lisbon, in which Pelé scored a hat-trick, was the greatest performance ever seen in the competition.

Qualified teams

Match details

First leg 

|valign="top"| 
|valign="top" width="50%"|

|}

Second leg 

|valign="top"| 
|valign="top" width="50%"|

See also
1962 Copa Libertadores
1961–62 European Cup
S.L. Benfica in international football
Santos FC in South America

References

Intercontinental Cup
Intercontinental Cup
I
I
Intercontinental Cup (football)
International club association football competitions hosted by Brazil
International club association football competitions hosted by Portugal
Inter
Inter
Intercontinental Cup
Intercontinental Cup
Sports competitions in Lisbon
1960s in Lisbon
20th century in Rio de Janeiro
International sports competitions in Rio de Janeiro (city)